"You Won't Forget Me" is a song recorded by German Eurodance group La Bouche, released on September 29, 1997, as the second single of their second album, S.O.S. (US version). It achieved a minor success in comparison with their 1995 hit, "Be My Lover", peaking at number 18 in Finland, number 24 in Sweden, number 28 in France and number 29 in Germany. On the Eurochart Hot 100, the song reached number 70. In the US, it peaked at number 48 on the Billboard Hot 100, and was also their last single on that chart.

Critical reception
Doug Hamilton from The Atlanta Constitution felt that "You Won't Forget Me" "lives up to its name --- it's a sassy bit of sexual bravado set to a percolating beat. Alas, the title track isn't a cover of the Abba classic, but, incredibly, it's almost as catchy. (Dig McCray's sly chant "dit-dit-dit, dash-dash-dash, dit-dit-dit".)" Larry Flick from Billboard noted that the song has a "fast-paced beat, bombastic vocals, candy-coated instrumentation, and a la-la-la chorus." He added that "several consecutive spins allow the song to eventually-and permanently-stick to the brain." William Stevenson from Entertainment Weekly said that "the insistent beat, heavy bass line, and oft-reprised refrain should haunt club kids all summer." Another editor, David Browne, commented, "The song is like a tank storming the sand dunes of your head. Its pumping, rock-this-party chorus—”Wherever you’re going, wherever you’ll be/ You won’t forget me”—is both a threat and a promise, and the single delivers on both."

Music video
A music video was produced to promote the single, directed by Andras Mahr & B. Falls. It was shot in the autumn of 1997 in New York City and features the duo performing the song on a stage in front of a dancing crowd. The video was later published on La Bouche's official YouTube channel in August 2015, and had generated more than 10 million views as of February 2023.

Charts

References

External links

1997 singles
La Bouche songs
Songs written by Frank Farian
1997 songs
Songs written by Peter Bischof-Fallenstein